Neoantrodia primaeva is a species of fungus belonging to the family Fomitopsidaceae.

Synonym:
 Antrodia primaeva Renvall & Niemelä, 1992 (= basionym)

References

Fomitopsidaceae